The Federal Reserve Bank of New York Buffalo Branch was a branch of the Federal Reserve Bank of New York that was closed on . It was located in the Federal Reserve Building at 160 Delaware Avenue, which has now been inhabited by the New Era Cap Company since November 21, 2006.

See also

 Federal Reserve Act
 Federal Reserve System
 Federal Reserve Districts
 Federal Reserve Branches
 Federal Reserve Bank of New York

References

Federal Reserve branches